The Las Vegas Hillbillys is a 1966 American country music comedy film directed by Arthur C. Pierce and starring Jayne Mansfield and Mamie Van Doren. The 1967 sequel film Hillbillys in a Haunted House soon followed with a similar cast.

The film was featured in an episode of The Canned Film Festival in the summer of 1986.

Plot
Woody Woodrow, a country bumpkin whose family makes and sells moonshine in backwoods Tennessee, inherits a Las Vegas casino and plans to turn it into a country and western bar.The rundown establishment is WAY out of town,but  country music is a
novelty they figure they can successfully promote.

On the plus side,buxom Boots Malone(Van Doren);who is smarter than she appears;signs on as hostess and business manager.

On the minus side,gangsters to whom the previous owners owed a sizeable amount of money keep coming around to collect;backed by
huge "enforcer" Richard Kiel (well before fame in James Bond movies).

Woody eventually manages to talk well-known country singers into appearing there;and pays off  the debt.
He then orders his staff to shower  the gangsters with pies on  their way out the door.

Cast
Ferlin Husky as Woody
Jayne Mansfield as Tawny
Mamie Van Doren as Boots Malone
Don Bowman as Jeepers
Billie Bird as Ma
Bill Anderson as himself
Wilma Burgess as herself
Roy Drusky as himself
Sonny James as himself
Duke of Paducah as himself
Del Reeves as himself
Connie Smith as herself
Robert V. Barron as Donald
Louis Quinn
Richard Kiel
John Harmon
Helen Clark
Bennett King
Tony Posey

See also
List of American films of 1966
List of films set in Las Vegas

References

External links
 
 

1966 films
1966 musical comedy films
American musical comedy films
Films set in the Las Vegas Valley
Films scored by Dean Elliott
1960s English-language films
1960s American films